The 2012 season was Sangju Sangmu Phoenix's eleventh season in the K-League in South Korea. Sangju Sangmu Phoenix was competing in K-League and Korean FA Cup.

Current squad

Transfer

In

Out

Coaching staff

Match results

K-League

All times are Korea Standard Time (KST) – UTC+9

League table

Results summary

Results by round

Korean FA Cup

Squad statistics

Appearances
Statistics accurate as of match played 28 June 2012

Goals and assists

Discipline

References

Sangju Sangmu Phoenix
2012